is an anime television series, based on Konami's best-selling video game franchise Goemon. The television series was produced by Trans Arts, aired from 1997 to 1998, ran for 23 episodes, and 5 volumes of videos were released on VHS and DVD. It was eventually picked up in North America for an English dub done by ADV Films under the name Legend of the Mystical Ninja.

Plot
The Demon Lord Makamuge intends to conquer both the game world and the real world, and it's up to Goemon and his friends to prevent this from happening.

Characters

Recurring
Goemon

Ebisumaru

Sasuke

Omitsu

Original

External links

1997 anime television series debuts
1997 Japanese television series debuts
1998 Japanese television series endings
ADV Films
Adventure anime and manga
Anime television series based on video games
Ganbare Goemon
Ninja in anime and manga
Science fiction anime and manga
TBS Television (Japan) original programming
Works based on Konami video games